"New York, New York" is a song by American electronica musician Moby. The song features guest vocals by Debbie Harry. It was released as the first and only single from his compilation album Go – The Very Best of Moby on October 23, 2006.

The cover image of the single depicts Moby himself sitting front of the New York-New York Hotel & Casino on the Las Vegas Strip. The music video was directed by Jen Miller and features a satirical comedy-dance performance by the Varsity Interpretive Dance Squad.

Track listing 
 CD single 
 "New York, New York"  – 3:47
 "Go"  – 6:00
 CD single 
 "New York, New York"  – 7:38
 "New York, New York"  – 5:56
 "New York, New York"  – 7:17
 "New York, New York"  – 11:22
 "New York, New York"  – 5:32
 12-inch single 
 "New York, New York"  – 7:38
 "Go"  – 7:05
 12-inch single 
 "New York, New York"  — 5:59
 "Porcelain"  — 8:36
 "In My Heart"  — 7:30
 12-inch single 
 "New York, New York"  — 11:22
 "Porcelain"  — 6:40
 "Porcelain"  — 6:40
 Digital single
 "New York, New York"  – 3:47
 "Go"  – 7:04

Charts

References

External links 
 

2006 singles
2006 songs
Moby songs
Debbie Harry songs
Songs about New York City
Songs written by Moby
Mute Records singles